The Sephardic Museum is a national museum in Toledo, Spain, that exhibits a collection of the Jewish cultural heritage in Spain, as well as of the Sephardim, the descendants of the Jews who lived on the Iberian peninsula until 1492. It occupies the former convent of the Knights of Calatrava, annexed to the Synagogue of El Tránsito.

History 
A 1964 decree created the institution and installation works began the following year. The museum was opened to visitors on 13 June 1971. In this way, aspirations dating back at least to 1915 about gathering in one building as many "testimonies of Jewish culture as may be found scattered throughout the Museums of Spain" became a reality. The collection was originally hosted in the halls formerly occupied by the archives of the orders of Calatrava and Alcántara.

In accordance with Royal Decree 1305/2009, of July 31, creating the Spanish Museum Network, the Museo Sefardí is one of the National Museums owned and managed by the State and attached to the Ministry of Culture.

History of the Jewish people 

The first room shows the history, geography and culture of the Jewish people in the Middle East, where according to the biblical writings the traditions that endured in their daily life originated. Archaeological objects dated between the 2000 B.C. and the 1st century A.C. are shown as well as a variety of cultural objects related to what it is and what it means to be Jewish, their beliefs and customs. It highlights a Torah (sacred book of the Judaism, formed by the Pentateuch) and other liturgical objects.

The Jews in the Iberian peninsula 

Main testimonies of the material culture throughout the Jewish presence in Spain are exposed: from his arrival in the Iberian Peninsula, their life in Roman and Visigothic times, their development in the Al-Andalus as well as in the Christian kingdoms during the 13th and 15th centuries, the converts, the Inquisition and the expulsion in 1492.

In the north courtyard, as a necropolis, some of the sepulchral tombstones of Jewish characters from different parts of Spain are exposed. In the courtyard the archaeological remains of some possible public baths of the old Jewish quarter of Toledo and the ground of the old Torah ark (main wall) of the synagogue are conserved.

The Sephardim and their way of life 

The toponym Sepharad appears in the Bible in verse 20 of the book of Obadiah; since the Middle Ages the word Sepharad has been used in the Hebrew language to designate Spain or the Iberian Peninsula in general and, later, in academia and other languages of culture, to Jewish Spain in particular. The use by extension of the adjective Sephardic is also relatively frequent to designate the Jew of the medieval Sepharad, according to the meaning of the word Sephardic in the Hebrew language.

This section is shown in the women's gallery, a special room for the liturgical follow-up by the female genie that attended the synagogue. As in other cultures, Judaism does not allow women to follow the liturgy from the prayer room. In this space, which preserves part of its original plasterwork decoration, there are showcases related to the daily life of the Sephardim: their birth, education, main festivals, death, etc.

Gallery

References 
Citations

Bibliography

External links
museosefardi.mcu.es
Sephardic Museum within Google Arts & Culture

Jewish museums in Spain
Sephardic
 Sefardí
Jews and Judaism in Toledo, Spain
Museums in Toledo, Spain